Rudolf Kotormány (23 January 1911 – 2 August 1983), also spelled in Romanian as Cotormani,  was a Romanian international footballer who played as a defender and coach. He was born  in Austria-Hungary (now in Romania).

Biography 

At club level, he spent his whole career in Liga I. After playing as a youth for the Timişoara-based team Fortuna, he made his Divizia A debut on 11 September 1932 in a 3–2 defeat to Rapid București.

In 1946, he joined CFR Timişoara, and played his last match in the division on 10 November 1946 in a 2–6 defeat against ITA Arad .

With the Romania national football team, he was picked by joint coaches Josef Uridil and Costel Rădulescu to play in the 1934 World Cup in Italy. The team were eliminated in the first round of this competition, losing 2–1 to Czechoslovakia.

Honours

Player
Ripensia Timișoara
Liga I (4): 1932–33, 1934–35, 1935–36, 1937–38
Cupa României (2): 1933–34, 1935–36

Notes and references 
 
 

Romanian sportspeople of Hungarian descent
1911 births
1983 deaths
Sportspeople from Timișoara
Romania international footballers
Romanian football managers
Romanian footballers
1934 FIFA World Cup players
Liga I players
FC Ripensia Timișoara players
FC CFR Timișoara players
Association football defenders